OlivePad VT100 is a tablet computer phone designed and developed by Olive Telecom for the Indian market. It was released on October 23, 2010. It has a dimension of 7-inches with a resolution of 800 x 480 on a capacitive touchscreen supporting multi-touch. The tablet runs the Android operating system (OS) and offers video calling over its 7.2 Mbit/s High-Speed Uplink Packet Access (HSUPA) 3G connectivity, among other features.

Hardware
Powered by an ARM11 600 MHz processor, the OlivePad is based on the Qualcomm MSM7227 chipset, and features 512 MB RAM, 512 MB inbuilt flash memory, and microSD expandability up to 32 GB, aside from a CMOS 3 megapixel camera and webcam. It will be India's first 3.5G tablet with HSUPA support. OlivePad will have quad-band GSM support and also would be available with tri-band WCDMA support.

At the rear of the tablet, there is a 3 megapixel autofocus camera supporting 4x zoom. The tablet also supports Wi-Fi 802.11 b/g, Bluetooth, standard USB 2.0 ports, an added compass, G-sensor, ambient light sensor and dual speakers built-in.

The device supports 720p video playback and has a 3.5-mm jack, supporting 3GP, MP4, Audio Video Interleave (AVI) and MP3 formats.

Software
The OlivePad runs the Android 2.2 Froyo OS with Android Market support. The OS is not fully standard and is slightly customized. The tablet does not support Flash due to the ARM6 limits.

See also
 Comparison of tablet PCs
 Adam tablet
 iPad
 HP Slate 500
 Sakshat

References

External links
 

Android (operating system) devices
Tablet computers
Tablet computers introduced in 2010